is a passenger railway station in located in the city of Yao,  Osaka Prefecture, Japan, operated by the private railway operator Kintetsu Railway.

Lines
Kintetsu Yao Station is served by the Osaka Line, and is located 9.6 rail kilometers from the starting point of the line at Ōsaka Uehommachi Station.

Station layout
The station consists of two elevated opposed side platforms with the station building underneath.

Platforms

Adjacent stations

History

Passenger statistics
In fiscal 2018, the station was used by an average of 37,867 passengers daily.

Surrounding area
Yao City Hall
Seibu Department Store Yao
Prism Hall
Ario Yao (Ito Yokado)
Shotengai
Pento Mall
Kintetsu Yao-kita Shotengai
Shin-Sakae Shotengai
Family Road
Kita-Hommachi Chuo-dori
Yao Omotedori
Osaka University of Economics and Law Yao Campus (official site)

Buses

Kintetsu Bus Co., Ltd.
Bus stop 1 Yao-Kyoto Route
Expressway buses for Kyoto Station Hachijoguchi (New Miyako Hotel)
Bus stop 3 Takasago Route
Route 94 for Takasago Housing via Ario Yao, Midorigaoka and Yamamoto-ekimae
Route 95 for Takasago Housing via Midorigaoka and Yamamoto-ekimae
Bus stop 4 Yao Route
Route 70 for  via , Taishido and 
Route 73 for Yaominami via JR Yao-ekimae and Taishido
Bus Stop 6 Kayashima Route for Kayafuri and 
Route 36 for JR  via 
Route 38 for Aramoto
Route 39 for  via JR Suminodo
Route 43 for JR Suminodo via Ario Yao and Aramoto
Route 44 for Kayashima via Ario Yao and JR Suminodo
Bus stop 7 Shiki Route
Route 26 for Shiki Depot via Yao Hokenjo-mae (Health Center), Shonaicho, Yaogi and Tainaka

Osaka Bus Co., Ltd.
Bus stop 7 Fuse-Yao Route
For Fuse Station via Kanaoka, Ohasu and

See also
List of railway stations in Japan

References

External links

 Kintetsu Yao Station 

Railway stations in Japan opened in 1924
Railway stations in Osaka Prefecture
Yao, Osaka